Aristide Briand is a future station on line 9 of the Paris Métro. The station is located on the Carrefour du 8 mai 1945 at Montreuil and slated to open in 2030.

References 

Paris Métro line 9
Paris Métro stations in Montreuil, Seine-Saint-Denis
Future Paris Métro stations
Railway stations scheduled to open in 2025